Antoine Rey (born 25 August 1986) is a Swiss professional football player who plays as a midfielder for Mendrisio-Stabio.

Career
He started his career at FC Lausanne-Sport when he was 16 years old and earned 172 senior appearances for the club before moving to FC Lugano. He reached 200 official appearances with FC Lugano on 29 May 2016 playing the 2015-16 Swiss Cup Final.

Rey signed with Mendrisio-Stabio in January 2019.

Personal life
He is a graduate of University of Lausanne where he earned his bachelor's degree in Biology. He earned his master's degree in Economics from Università della Svizzera Italiana.

Honours 
Lugano
Winner
 Swiss Challenge League: 2014–15

Runner-up
 Swiss Challenge League: 2013–14

References

External links 
 

1986 births
Living people
Swiss men's footballers
FC Lugano players
FC Lausanne-Sport players
FC Chiasso players
Swiss Super League players
Swiss Challenge League players
Association football midfielders